The 1946 Svenska Cupen final took place on 25 August 1946 at Råsunda in Solna. It was contested between Malmö FF and Åtvidabergs FF. Åtvidaberg played their first cup final ever, Malmö FF played their third consecutive final and their third final in total. Malmö FF won their second title with a 3–0 victory.

Match details

External links
Svenska Cupen at svenskfotboll.se

1946
Cup
Malmö FF matches
Åtvidabergs FF matches
Football in Stockholm
August 1946 sports events in Europe